Creditors is a 1988 Swedish drama film based upon the play by August Strindberg. It was directed by Stefan Böhm, Keve Hjelm and John Olsson. Tomas Bolme won the award for Best Actor at the 24th Guldbagge Awards.

Plot
The depressed Adolf has been visited by his new friend Gustav who is in contact with him about what he is going to do with his wife Tekla.

Cast
 Bibi Andersson as Tekla
 Tomas Bolme as Adolf
 Keve Hjelm as Gustav

References

External links
 
 

1988 films
1988 drama films
Films based on works by August Strindberg
Swedish drama films
1980s Swedish-language films
1980s Swedish films